Wright Brothers Park is an urban park in Montgomery, Alabama, United States.

The park was renamed from Overlook Park to Wright Brothers Park on July 2, 2013, in dedication to the Wright Brothers. The park underwent renovations and redecoration for the dedication. One of the objects of redecoration is a full-scale replica of the Wright Flyer which is right above the Alabama River.

Wright Brothers Park features beautiful views of the Alabama River and the surrounding area. Picnic shelters with off-street parking provide a pleasant place for a family picnic. Amenities include benches, trails with views of the river, and a playground. The park has four picnic tables under a gazebo overlooking the Alabama River (Maxwell Boulevard).

Amenities
The park overlooks the Alabama River, providing picnic shelters and tables, and off-street parking.

Location

Address
544 Maxwell Blvd, Montgomery, AL 36104

References
5. https://www.funinmontgomery.com/Home/Components/FacilityDirectory/FacilityDirectory/273/3056

Montgomery, Alabama
Parks in Alabama
Wright brothers